Mordellistena olympica is a species of beetle in the genus Mordellistena of the family Mordellidae, which is part of the superfamily Tenebrionoidea. It was discovered in 1965 and can be found in such countries as Bulgaria, Greece, Kosovo, Montenegro, Serbia, the Republic of Macedonia, and Voivodina.

References

Beetles described in 1965
olympica
Beetles of Europe